Gilligan's Island is a Midway pinball machine (produced under the Bally name) released in May 1991. It is based on the television series of the same name and the first Williams WPC machine that was released with a high resolution (128x32) dot matrix display (the first DMD as used in Checkpoint by Data East and released three months earlier only featured 128x16).  Bob Denver supplied original speech for the game which also featured the theme song from the television show.  Tina Louise refused to lend her likeness and an alternate blonde character appears on the backglass of the machine.

Overview
OBJECTIVE:  The machine's game card describes the game objective as to relieve the Natives Island God, KONA.  Collect all seven ingredients of the Professor's Secret Formula Lava Seltzer.  Take the Lava Seltzer through the Jungle Run Trails and get it to Kona.  If successful, you receive "Kona's Treasure", 50 million points!
Other objectives include:

 L-A-G-O-O-N TARGETS:  Completing the lagoon targets qualifies the lagoon for random values between 150,000 to 3,000,000 points, multi-ball, bonus ball or special.

 KICKBACK:

 GIFT OF GODS:  All other players collect 1 million points.

 BONUS BALLS:  All bonus balls given are played at the end of the game. After 5 have been earned, however, a score bonus is given.

References

External links
Internet Pinball Database entry for Gilligan's Island
Pinpedia Entry for Gilligan's Island
Gilligan's Island Pinball Music Excerpts

Gilligan's Island
Pinball machines based on television series
Bally pinball machines
1991 pinball machines